Big in Japan: Live in Tokyo 2010 is the fortieth album by Klaus Schulze. Taking in consideration the previously released multi-disc box sets (Silver Edition, Historic Edition, Jubilee Edition, Contemporary Works I, and Contemporary Works II), it could be viewed as Schulze's one hundred and first album. This album contains music from two final concerts at the Tokyo Kokusai Forum Hall in Tokyo, Japan on 20–21 March 2010 in Schulze's first and only visit to Japan. This is Schulze's first album without guest vocalist Lisa Gerrard since his 2007 album Kontinuum. The album was originally released on 22 September 2010 in Japan by Captain Trip Records as a limited edition deluxe boxed set (500 copies) of two CDs and a DVD with an 80-page photo book. This became known as the "Japanese Edition". A slightly different general release was released in Europe on 26 November 2010. This version, named the "European Edition", features a different track order between the CDs and the DVD, and slightly different track lengths. On 19 April 2011 a third version of Big in Japan was released in the United States. This "American Edition" consists of the same two CDs as the European version, but features a completely different DVD.

Track listing

Disc 1

Disc 2

DVD

Difference between editions

Notes
The music is not presented chronologically. On 20 March these tracks were played in the following sequence:
The Crystal Returns
Sequencers are Beautiful
The Deductive Approach
On 21 March these tracks were played in the following sequence:
A Crystal Poem
La Joyeuse Apocalypse
Nippon Benefit

References

External links
 Big in Japan: Live in Tokyo 2010 (Japanese Edition) at the official site of Klaus Schulze
 Big in Japan: Live in Tokyo 2010 (European Edition) at the official site of Klaus Schulze
 Big in Japan: Live in Tokyo 2010 (American Edition) at the official site of Klaus Schulze
 

Klaus Schulze albums
Ambient albums by German artists
Trance albums
2010 live albums
Klaus Schulze live albums